This is a list of East Java major league professional sports teams.

East Java